Mineralization may refer to:
 Biomineralization (mineralization in biology), when an inorganic substance precipitates in an organic matrix
 Mineralized tissues are tissues that have undergone mineralization, including bones, teeth, antlers, and marine shells
 Bone remodeling, involving demineralization and remineralization in bones
 Ossification (osteogenesis), mineralization of bone
 Mineralization (geology), the hydrothermal deposition of economically important metals in the formation of ore bodies or lodes
 Mineralization (soil science), the release of plant-available compounds such as ammonium during decomposition

See also
Demineralisation (disambiguation)
Remineralization (disambiguation)
Remineralisation of teeth (including de- and remineralization of teeth as an ongoing process)